José Daniel van Tuyne (born 13 December 1954 in Rosario) is an Argentine former footballer who played as a defender.

Club career
Van Tuyne started his career with Rosario Central in 1974. He joined Talleres de Córdoba in 1980 and then Racing Club in 1981.

In 1982 Van Tuyne left Argentine football to play for Millonarios in Colombia. Van Tuyne's ancestors were Belgian immigrants, hence the unusual surname. Other famous Argentinian footballers like Fernando Paternoster and Rafael Albrecht also had Belgian roots.

International career
Van Tuyne was included in the Argentina squad for the Copa América 1979 and the 1982 FIFA World Cup.

References

1954 births
Living people
Footballers from Rosario, Santa Fe
Argentine footballers
Argentine expatriate footballers
Argentina international footballers
Argentine people of Dutch descent
1982 FIFA World Cup players
1979 Copa América players
Argentine Primera División players
Rosario Central footballers
Talleres de Córdoba footballers
Racing Club de Avellaneda footballers
Millonarios F.C. players
Expatriate footballers in Colombia
Association football defenders